The 1999 St. George Illawarra Dragons season was the first in the joint venture club's history. The Dragons competed in the NRL's 1999 premiership season. The team finished sixth in the regular season, before making and losing the grand final against the Melbourne Storm in front of a record-breaking crowd, with 107,999 people in attendance at the new Stadium Australia.

Squad gains and losses

Ladder

Ladder progression

Season results

References 

St. George Illawarra Dragons
St. George Illawarra Dragons seasons
1999 in rugby league by club